Nikumaroro, previously known as Kemins Island or Gardner Island, is a part of the Phoenix Islands, Kiribati, in the western Pacific Ocean. It is a remote, elongated, triangular coral atoll with profuse vegetation and a large central marine lagoon. The rim has two narrow entrances, both of which are blocked by a wide reef, which is dry at low tide. The ocean beyond the reef is very deep, and the only anchorage is at the island's west end, across the reef from the ruins of a mid-20th-century British colonial village, but this is safe only with the southeast trade winds. Landing has always been difficult and is most often done south of the anchorage. Although occupied at various times during the past, the island is uninhabited today.

Kiribati declared the Phoenix Islands Protected Area in 2006, with the park being expanded in 2008. The 425,300-km2 (164,200-mi2) marine reserve contains eight coral atolls including Nikumaroro.

Nikumaroro has been the focus of considerable speculation and exploration as a location where pilot Amelia Earhart might have crashed in July 1937 during her ill-fated final flight, which attempted to circumnavigate the globe. However, to date, no evidence of her plane has been found on or in the vicinity of the island.

Geography
Thick scrub and Pisonia forest cover the land surface. The trees grow  in height and result in decomposing leaf material in the soil. Coconut palms remain from the attempts to operate a plantation on the island from 1893 to 1894 and later from 1938 to 1963.

The scarcity of fresh water on Nikumaroro has proven problematic for residents in the past, and contributed directly to the failure of a British project to colonize the island from 1938 to 1963.

Flora and fauna

Nikumaroro's flora and fauna

Nikumaroro is sporadically visited by biologists attracted to its extensive marine and avian ecosystems. The atoll has populations of coconut crabs and migratory birds, and rats abound. Several species of sharks and bottlenose dolphins have been observed in the surrounding waters.

The island is part of the Phoenix Islands Protected Area, and as such, has been named an Important Bird Area, especially for its breeding colony of red-tailed tropicbirds.

Nikumaroro's reefs
The 2000 surveys (Obura, et al.) identified that the leeward sites on the reef had 25-40% Live Coral Cover (LCC), in some places exceeding 75% LCC on the shallow reef platforms. Coralline algae, Halimeda and coral rubble were the three other dominant cover categories. The windward sites on the reef had an estimated 70% LCC and the lower cover on the reef slope was 30% LCC. The steep slope was dominated by Halimeda with plates of Porites rus. In contrast to the leeward side, very little loose coral rubble was found with the majority of bare surfaces covered by encrusting coralline algae in shallow water. The most abundant coral species at Nikumaroro included: Acroporidae (staghorn corals), Acropora cytherea, Montipora efflorescens, Favites pentagona, Leptastrea purpurea, Pocillopora verrucosa, Pavona minuta and Pavona varians.

Nikumaroro is in a naturally iron poor region. The introduction of iron to this environment from shipwrecks and anchor gear, is linked to proliferation of turf algae and benthic bacterial communities, and degraded ‘black reefs’.

History

19th-century sightings and claims
Nikumaroro was known by sundry names during the early 19th century: Kemins' Island, Kemis Island, Motu Oonga, Motu Oona, and Mary Letitia's Island. The first record of a European sighting was made by Capt. C. Kemiss (or Kemin, Kemish) from the British whaling ship Eliza Ann in 1824. On 19 August 1840, the USS Vincennes of the U.S. Exploring Expedition confirmed its position and recorded the atoll's name as Gardner Island, originally given in 1825 by Joshua Coffin of the Nantucket whaler Ganges. Some sources say the island was named after U.S. Congressman Gideon Gardner, who owned the Ganges.

In 1856, Nikumaroro was claimed as "Kemins Island" by CA Williams & Co. of New London, Connecticut, under the American Guano Islands Act. No record exists of guano deposits ever being exploited, however. On 28 May 1892, the island was claimed by the United Kingdom during a call by HMS Curacoa. Almost immediately, a license was granted to Pacific entrepreneur John T. Arundel for planting coconuts. Twenty-nine islanders were settled there and some structures with corrugated iron roofs were constructed, but a severe drought resulted in the failure of this project within a year. In 1916, it was leased to a Captain E.F.H. Allen of the Samoa Shipping Trading Co Ltd, but remained uninhabited until 1938.

SS Norwich City wreck
During a storm on 29 November 1929, the SS Norwich City, a large unladen British freighter with a crew of 35 men, ran aground on the reef at the island's northwest corner. A fire broke out in the engine room and all hands abandoned ship in darkness through storm waves across the dangerous coral reef. There were 11 fatalities. The survivors camped near collapsed structures from the abortive Arundel coconut plantation and were rescued after several days on the island. The devastated wreck of the Norwich City was a prominent landmark on the reef for 70 years, although by 2007, only the ship's keel, engine, and two large tanks remained. A Digital Globe satellite image taken 15 November 2016, shows one of the two tanks pushed inland by wave action, and the engine is now gone.

Amelia Earhart
Amelia Earhart attempted her world flight in 1937, but she and navigator Fred Noonan disappeared after the plane left Lae, New Guinea and headed for Howland Island. During the subsequent search for them and their plane, the United States Navy checked several nearby islands, including Gardner Island. A few months after their disappearance, a boat also visited Gardner Island, but found nothing. In 1938, recent skeletal remains were found on the island, but they were not linked to Earhart's flight.

The International Group for Historic Aircraft Recovery (TIGHAR) made several expeditions to Nikumaroro during the 1990s, 2000s, and 2010s. The group investigated the renewed hypothesis that Earhart and Noonan had landed on Gardner Island after they had failed to find Howland Island. TIGHAR found and cataloged artifacts: U.S. beauty and skin-care products that may have dated to the 1930s, such as flakes of rouge and a shattered mirror from a woman's cosmetic compact, parts of a folding pocket knife, traces of campfires bearing bird and fish bones, clams opened in the same way as oysters in New England, "empty shells laid out as if to collect rain water", and U.S. bottles dating from before World War II. What appeared to be the phalanx bone of a human finger had DNA tests done, but the tests were inconclusive as to whether it was turtle or human bone. A piece of aircraft grade aluminum found on the island closely resembles a patch that is in photographs of Earhart's airplane.

The TIGHAR hypothesis has many critics, with TIGHAR's founder and executive director, Richard Gillespie, described as a good showman who lacks credible results. A curator at the Smithsonian Institution's Air and Space Museum said: "Not to impugn [Gillespie], but I don't think he's found anything on any expedition." To date, TIGHAR has failed to connect any of their artifacts to Earhart, Noonan, or to any specific person or persons known to have been on the island from 1929 to present. TIGHAR has failed to provide any dating to establish how long any of the artifacts were in the ground, nor has it provided evidence as to when the artifacts may have arrived on the island.

Famed ocean explorer Robert Ballard led a 2019 expedition to locate Earhart's Lockheed Model 10-E Electra or evidence that it landed on Nikumaroro. After days of searching the deep cliffs supporting the island and the nearby ocean using state of the art equipment and technology, Ballard did not find any evidence of the plane or any associated wreckage of it. Allison Fundis, Ballard's chief operating officer stated: "We felt like if her plane was there, we would have found it pretty early in the expedition."

In their October 2019 documentary, "Expedition Amelia" tracing Robert Ballard's efforts, National Geographic stated regarding the Gardner Island (Nikumaroro) hypothesis, "It’s a nice story. But like all the other evidence obtained here over the decades, there is no provable link to Amelia or her plane."

British settlement scheme

On 1 December 1938, members of the British Pacific Islands Survey Expedition arrived to evaluate the island as a possible location for either seaplane landings or an airfield. On 20 December, more British officials arrived with 20 Gilbertese settlers in the last colonial expansion of the British Empire (other than formal annexations preparatory to withdrawal, etc.).

The British colonial officer Gerald Gallagher established a headquarters of the Phoenix Islands Settlement Scheme in the village located on the island's western end, on the south side of the largest entrance to the lagoon. Efforts to clear land and plant coconuts were hindered by a profound lack of drinking water. By June 1939, a few wells had been successfully established and 58 I-Kiribati were on Gardner, comprising 16 men, 16 women, and 26 children. Wide coral-gravel streets and a parade ground were laid out and important structures included a thatched administration house, a wood-frame cooperative store, and a radio shack. Gallagher died and was buried on the island in 1941.

At his mother's request, Gallagher's remains were moved to Tarawa for reburial and the memorial plaque was retrieved. Although reasons cited for giving up on the struggling colony included unstable water lenses and uncertain copra markets, observers familiar with the colony's history remarked that after Gallagher's death a "will" or "nerve" to succeed seemed to vanish from the settlements.

From 1944 through 1945, the United States Coast Guard operated a navigational LORAN station with 25 crewmen on the southeastern tip of Gardner, installing an antenna system, quonset huts, and some smaller structures. Only scattered debris remains on the site.

The island's population reached a high of about 100 by the mid-1950s, but by the early 1960s, periodic drought and an unstable freshwater lens had thwarted the struggling colony. Nikumaroro (together with Manra and Orona) was evacuated by the British government in 1963. Its residents were evacuated to the Solomon Islands by the British, and by 1965, Gardner was officially uninhabited.

The Gardner Island Post Office opened around 1939 and closed around January 1964.

Kiribati

In 1971, the UK granted self-rule to the Gilbert Islands, which achieved complete independence in 1979 as Kiribati. That same year, the United States, after having recently surveyed the island for possible weapons testing, relinquished any claims to Gardner through the Treaty of Tarawa. The island was officially renamed Nikumaroro, a name inspired by Gilbertese legends and used by the settlers during the 1940s and 1950s.

See also

 
 List of Guano Island claims
 List of islands
 Desert island

References

Notes

Citations

Bibliography

 Bryan, Edwin H., Jr. American Polynesia and the Hawaiian Chain. Honolulu, Hawaii: Tongg Publishing Company, 1942.
 Crouch, Thomas D. "Searching for Amelia Earhart." Invention & Technology, Volume 23, Issue 1, Summer 2007.
 
 Gillespie, Ric. Finding Amelia: The True Story of the Earhart Disappearance. Annapolis, Maryland: Naval Institute Press, 2006. .
 Jones, A.G.E. Ships Employed in the South Seas Trade, 1775–1861 (Part I and II) and Registrar General of Shipping and Seamen Transcripts of Registers of Shipping, 1787–1862 (Part III). Canberra, Australia: Roebuck Society, 1986. .
 Maude, Henry Evans. Of Islands and Men: Studies in Pacific History. Melbourne, Australia: Oxford University Press, 1968. .
 Reynolds, J.N. Report dated 24 September 1829 in: American State Papers, Documents Legislative and Executive of the Congress of the United States from the Second Session of the Twenty-first to the First Session of the Twenty-fourth Congress... Volume IV Naval Affairs, Document 573, Information Collected by the Navy Department Relating to Islands, Reefs, Shoals etc, in the Pacific Ocean (29 January 1835). Washington, D.C.: Gales's & Seaton, 1861.
 Stackpole, Edouard A. The Sea-Hunters, The New England Whalemen during Two Centuries: 1635–1835. Philadelphia: Lippincott, 1953.
 Strippel, Richard G. "Researching Amelia: A Detailed Summary for the Serious Researcher into the Disappearance of Amelia Earhart." Air Classics, Vol. 31, No. 11, November 1995.

External links

Geographical map of Nikumaroro (Earhart related)
Earhart Project Hypothesis, Summer 2009
Forensic Imaging Project II (Earhart related)
 Miamiherald.com: Planned July 2012 search for Earhart
 Tighar.org: Hydrographic Office Chart 125
 Natlib.govt.nz: 1889 Survey catalog entry
 http://www.loran-history.info/Gardner_Island/gardner.htm

Atolls of Kiribati
Phoenix Islands (Kiribati)
Phoenix Islands Settlement Scheme
Uninhabited islands of Kiribati
Former disputed islands
Former populated places in Oceania
Former regions and territories of the United States
Pacific islands claimed under the Guano Islands Act
Seabird colonies
Important Bird Areas of Kiribati